Chor Machaye Shor is a 1974 Indian Hindi-language film directed by Ashok Roy and produced by N. N. Sippy. The film stars Shashi Kapoor, Mumtaz, Danny Denzongpa, Madan Puri, Asrani and Asit Sen. The music is by Ravindra Jain. Asrani earned a Filmfare nomination for best performance in a comic role, the only nomination for the film. The film became a "superhit" and earned the second spot at the box office in 1974. It was filmed at the Pratapgad fort in Maharashtra.

Because of the film's success, the film's producer (N. N. Sippy), cast (Shashi Kapoor, Danny Denzongpa, Asrani, Madan Puri) and music composer (Ravindra Jain) teamed up again for Fakira (1976), which also became a box office hit.

"Le Jayenge, Le Jayenge Dilwale Dulhaniya Le Jayenge" is a very popular song from the film, Dilwale Dulhania Le Jayenge (1995) later adopted it as its film title. The film was remade in Telugu as Bhale Dongalu (1976 film)

Plot

Vijay (Shashi Kapoor) is an engineer, who is in love with a rich girl named Rekha (Mumtaz).  Rekha's snobbish father disapproves because Vijay is not wealthy, and so he has arranged for her to be married to a son of an evil politician. The evil politician is played by Madan Puri. Rekha's father and the politician frame Vijay for a crime that he didn't commit, and he goes to jail. When he's in jail, he becomes friends with three other prisoners. All four men escape from jail. After Vijay reconnects with Rekha, they all go to a small village called Shantinagar and help save the village from the evil politician and the bandits that terrorize the town. The evil politician is arrested. Rekha's father feels remorse and accepts Vijay. Vijay and his three prisoner friends go back to jail. However, the film ends on an optimistic tone indicating that their good deeds will be rewarded (i.e. that their prison sentences will be shortened).

Cast
 Shashi Kapoor as Vijay Sharma
 Mumtaz as Rekha
 Asrani as Bhalua
 Tarun Ghosh as Kalua
 Danny Denzongpa as Raju Ustad
 Madan Puri as Seth Jamunadas
 Kamal Kapoor as Jagdish, Rekha's father
 Asit Sen as Thanedar
 Chaman Puri as Mukhiya
 Ram Mohan as Daku Ranjit Singh
 Uma Dutt as Jailor
 Sajjan as Amritlal
 Meena T. as Chandramukhi
 Chandrima Bhaduri as Mausi
 Shyam Kumar as Daku Rupa singh
 Moolchand as the stout prisoner
 Master Chintu
 Hangama as Bhukelal, prison cook

Soundtrack
The song of this movie was composed by the blind music composer, late Ravindra Jain. This was his first movie as music director. All the songs featured in the film were evergreen songs. The Lyrics of "Le Jayenge, Le Jayenge Dilwale Dulhaniya Le Jayenge" and "Ek Dal Par Tota Bole, Ek Dal Par Maina" were written by Inderjeet Singh Tulsi. The rest of the lyrics were written by Ravindra Jain. 'Ek Dal Par Tota Bole' was shot in Mahabaleshwar, the famous 'Elephant Head point' can be seen in the background.

Legacy 
The 1995 superhit movie of Shah Rukh Khan Dilwale Dulhaniya Le Jayenge 's title is adopted from this film's song "Le Jayenge, Le Jayenge Dilwale Dulhaniya Le Jayenge".

References

External links 
 

Hindi films remade in other languages
1974 films
1970s Hindi-language films
Films scored by Ravindra Jain
Films shot in Maharashtra